Remington College is a common name used by all 16 campuses of a group of private colleges throughout the United States. Remington College operates 16 campuses in several US states. Some of the affiliated institutions have been in operation since the 1940s.

The oldest campus is the former Spencer Business College in Lafayette, Louisiana, founded in 1940. The newest campus is in Columbia, South Carolina. Remington College is headquartered in Lake Mary, Florida. Remington College offers degree and diploma programs that vary by campus in career fields that include business, information technology, criminal justice, electronics, graphic arts, beauty, and the health sciences.

Campuses
 Online, Distance Learning
 Baton Rouge, Louisiana
 Shreveport, Louisiana
 Lafayette, Louisiana
 Cleveland, Ohio
 Columbia, South Carolina
 Dallas, Texas
 Fort Worth, Texas
 North Houston (Greenspoint), Texas
 Southeast Houston (Webster), Texas
 Knoxville, TN
 Little Rock, Arkansas
 Memphis, Tennessee
 Mobile, Alabama
 Nashville, Tennessee

Online degree programs
Remington College announced, in October 2009, online programs for students in over 40 states. Online degree programs include:

Accreditation
Remington College has been part of the U.S. higher-education community since 1987. Each campus is accredited by the Accrediting Commission of Career Schools and Colleges  (ACCSC).

References

External links

 

Educational institutions established in 1940
1940 establishments in Louisiana
Non-profit organizations based in Little Rock, Arkansas
Private universities and colleges in the United States